The 1989–90 New York Knicks season was the 44th season for the Knicks in the National Basketball Association. Before the season, owners Gulf+Western reorganized and became Paramount Communications, renaming themselves after the Paramount Pictures film studio.

During the off-season, the Knicks hired Stu Jackson as their new head coach; Jackson previously worked as an assistant coach for the Knicks. The team got off to a solid start, winning 20 of their first 27 games, while posting a nine-game winning streak, and holding a 32–16 record at the All-Star break. At midseason, the Knicks traded second-year guard Rod Strickland to the San Antonio Spurs in exchange for All-Star guard Maurice Cheeks. However, as they stood at a 39–22 record, they struggled and lost 15 of their final 21 games. The Knicks had a 45–37 record and finished third in the Atlantic Division. The Knicks' fifth-place finish in the Eastern Conference earned them a berth in the NBA Playoffs for the third straight year. 

Patrick Ewing averaged 28.6 points, 10.9 rebounds and 4.0 blocks per game, and was named to the All-NBA First Team, selected for the 1990 NBA All-Star Game, and finished in fifth place in Most Valuable Player voting. In addition, Charles Oakley averaged 14.6 points and 11.9 rebounds per game, while Gerald Wilkins provided the team with 14.5 points per game, and Johnny Newman contributed 12.9 points per game. Kiki Vandeweghe provided with 11.7 points per game, and Mark Jackson averaged 9.9 points, 7.4 assists and 1.3 steals per game.

In the first round of the Eastern Conference playoffs, New York trailed 0–2 to Larry Bird and the 4th-seeded Boston Celtics, suffering a 157–128 road loss in Game 2, but managed to win the next three games and the series. The Knicks were then eliminated in the Eastern Conference Semi-finals by the defending champion Detroit Pistons in five games. The Pistons would go on to defeat the Portland Trail Blazers in five games in the NBA Finals, winning their second consecutive championship. Following the season, Newman signed as a free agent with the Charlotte Hornets.

For the season, the Knicks slightly changed their primary logo, changing the color of the basketball under the team name from brown to orange. The logo remained in use until 1992.

Draft picks

Roster

Regular season

Season standings

z – clinched division title
y – clinched division title
x – clinched playoff spot

Record vs. opponents

Game log

Playoffs

|- align="center" bgcolor="#ffcccc"
| 1
| April 26
| @ Boston
| L 105–116
| Patrick Ewing (22)
| Patrick Ewing (9)
| Maurice Cheeks (9)
| Boston Garden14,890
| 0–1
|- align="center" bgcolor="#ffcccc"
| 2
| April 28
| @ Boston
| L 128–157
| Patrick Ewing (28)
| Charles Oakley (9)
| Gerald Wilkins (7)
| Boston Garden14,890
| 0–2
|- align="center" bgcolor="#ccffcc"
| 3
| May 2
| Boston
| W 102–99
| Patrick Ewing (33)
| Patrick Ewing (19)
| Maurice Cheeks (11)
| Madison Square Garden18,212
| 1–2
|- align="center" bgcolor="#ccffcc"
| 4
| May 4
| Boston
| W 135–108
| Patrick Ewing (44)
| Patrick Ewing (13)
| Maurice Cheeks (12)
| Madison Square Garden18,212
| 2–2
|- align="center" bgcolor="#ccffcc"
| 5
| May 6
| @ Boston
| W 121–114
| Patrick Ewing (31)
| Charles Oakley (17)
| Patrick Ewing (10)
| Boston Garden14,890
| 3–2
|-

|- align="center" bgcolor="#ffcccc"
| 1
| May 8
| @ Detroit
| L 77–112
| Patrick Ewing (19)
| Eddie Lee Wilkins (8)
| Maurice Cheeks (6)
| The Palace of Auburn Hills21,454
| 0–1
|- align="center" bgcolor="#ffcccc"
| 2
| May 10
| @ Detroit
| L 97–104
| Gerald Wilkins (24)
| Charles Oakley (15)
| Maurice Cheeks (8)
| The Palace of Auburn Hills21,454
| 0–2
|- align="center" bgcolor="#ccffcc"
| 3
| May 12
| Detroit
| W 111–103
| Patrick Ewing (45)
| Charles Oakley (20)
| Maurice Cheeks (12)
| Madison Square Garden18,212
| 1–2
|- align="center" bgcolor="#ffcccc"
| 4
| May 13
| Detroit
| L 90–102
| Patrick Ewing (30)
| Charles Oakley (14)
| Cheeks, Jackson (6)
| Madison Square Garden18,212
| 1–3
|- align="center" bgcolor="#ffcccc"
| 5
| May 15
| @ Detroit
| L 84–95
| Patrick Ewing (22)
| Patrick Ewing (14)
| Maurice Cheeks (9)
| The Palace of Auburn Hills21,454
| 1–4
|-

Player statistics

NOTE: Please write the player statistics in alphabetical order by last name.

Season

Playoffs

Awards and records
Patrick Ewing, All-NBA First Team

Transactions

References

External links
1989–90 New York Knickerbockers Statistics

New York Knicks
New York Knicks
New York Knicks seasons
New York Knicks
1980s in Manhattan
1990s in Manhattan
Madison Square Garden